Texas City is a city in Galveston County in the U.S. state of Texas. Located on the southwest shoreline of Galveston Bay, Texas City is a busy deepwater port on Texas's Gulf Coast, as well as a petroleum-refining and petrochemical-manufacturing center. The population was 51,898 at the 2020 census, making it the third-largest city in Galveston County, behind League City and Galveston. It is a part of the Houston metropolitan area.  The city is notable as the site of a major explosion in 1947 that demolished the port and much of the city.

History

Three duck hunters in 1891 noted that a location along Galveston Bay, known locally as Shoal Point, had the potential to become a major port. Shoal Point had existed since the 1830s, when veterans of the Texas Revolution (1835–1836) were awarded land for their services. The name was applied to the community when a post office opened in 1878. The duck hunters were three brothers from Duluth, Minnesota, named Benjamin, Henry, and Jacob Myers. After they returned to Duluth, they formed the Myers Brothers syndicate, convinced other investors to put up money to buy  of Galveston Bay frontage, including Shoal Point. They renamed the area Texas City.

Founding

By 1893, the investors had formed the Texas City Improvement Company (TCIC), which plotted and filed the townsite plan. A post office opened in 1893 with Frank B. Davison appointed as the town's first postmaster, to serve about 250 people who had moved there from Minnesota and Michigan. TCIC also received permission from the federal government to dredge an eight-foot channel in the bay from Bolivar Roads (at the east end of Galveston Island) to serve Texas City. In 1894, the channel was first used commercially. TCIC eventually dredged the channel to a 40-foot depth and extended the length of the port to 1.5 mi. TCIC also built a 4-mi railroad to the Texas City Junction south of town, where it connected to two other rail lines: Galveston, Houston and San Antonio and Galveston-Houston and Henderson.

Despite these successes, the TCIC went bankrupt in 1897. Its assets were reorganized into two new companies: Texas City Company (TCC), and Texas City Railway Terminal Company (TCRTC). TCC acquired 3,000 city lots and provided water, gas, and electricity to the town. TCRTC operated the railroad. These companies were chartered on February 4, 1899.

A grid of streets and avenues was laid out during the 1890s, and houses and other structures began to appear. The Davison Home, where the first childbirth in the town took place, was constructed between 1895 and 1897.  As the TCIC, the TCC, and TCRTC expanded, urbanization expanded.

Permission was granted in the summer of 1900 to dredge the Texas City channel to a depth of 25 ft. The disastrous Galveston Hurricane of 1900 interrupted the project, washing the dredge ashore. However, the Texas City port remained open after the storm passed. Even before the channel dredging was complete, the first ocean-going ship, SS Piqua, arrived at the port from Mexico on September 28, 1904. Dredging was completed March 19, 1905, when the US government opened a customs house in Texas City. Port growth progressed rapidly after this, from 12 ships in 1904, to 239 in 1910.

Texas City Refining Company was chartered in 1908 to build a refinery adjacent to the port facility. For several years, it was the only Texas refinery capable of producing the byproducts wax and lubricating oil. This facility was later acquired and expanded by Texas oilman Sid Richardson. Three more refineries soon followed, making Texas City a major port for deepwater shipping of Texas petroleum products to the Atlantic Coast.

Texas City incorporated in 1911 with a mayor and commission form of government. It held its first mayoral election on September 16, choosing William P. Tarpey as mayor.

The 2nd Division of the United States Army deployed to Texas City in 1913 to guard the Gulf Coast from incursions during the Mexican Revolution, essentially encamping nearly half of the nation's land military personnel there, due to the perceived double threat that the Mexican Revolution might spill over across the border or that the neighboring country might become a German ally in the incipient World War.

The military deployment also included the 1st Aero Division, and the Wright brothers trained over a dozen soldiers as military pilots, essentially turning Texas City into the birthplace of what became the United States Air Force, as the city claims at its monument of the birthplace of the Air Force at Bay Street City Park. Speed and distance records were set by pilots trained and planes flying out of Texas City's impromptu military air base.

An August 1915 hurricane completely demolished the encampment. Nine soldiers were killed. Military leaders promptly moved the camp to San Antonio.

In 1921, the Texas City Railway Terminal Company took over operations of the port facilities. Hugh B. Moore was named president of the company and began an ambitious program of expansions. He was credited with attracting a sugar refinery, a fig processing plant, a gasoline cracking plant, and a grain elevator. Also, more warehouses and tank farms were built to support this growth. By 1925, Texas City had an estimated population of 3,500 and was a thriving community with two refineries producing gasoline, the Texas City Sugar Refinery, two cotton compressing facilities, and even passenger bus service.

The Great Depression and competition caused the sugar refinery to fail in 1930. Economic hard times afflicted the city for a few years until the oil business returned to expansion. Republic Oil Refinery opened a gasoline refinery in 1931. In 1934, Pan American Refinery (a subsidiary of Standard Oil Company of Indiana) began operating. Moore was able to win this refinery from the Houston Ship Channel because of Texas City's location nearer the Gulf of Mexico. By the end of the 1930s, Texas City's population had grown to 5,200.

Seatrain Lines constructed a terminal at the Texas City port during 1939–1940. This was a specialized company that owned ships designed to carry railroad cars from Texas City to New York City on a weekly schedule. By 1940, Texas City was the fourth-ranked Texas port, exceeded only by Houston, Beaumont, and Port Arthur.

Texas City Dike

Texas City is home to the Texas City Dike, a man-made breakwater built of tumbled granite blocks in the 1930s, that was originally designed to protect the lower Houston Ship Channel from silting.

World War II impact

Prosperity and industrial expansion returned as the United States became more involved in World War II. Enemy submarines had almost completely stopped the shipment of petroleum products to friendly countries from the Middle East, South America, and Southeast Asia. Texas City refineries and chemical plants worked around the clock at full capacity to supply the war effort. Realizing that all of the world's tin smelters could no longer supply the US demand, Jesse H. Jones, head of the Defense Plant Corporation, decided to build the Texas City tin smelter. The government also funded construction of a petrochemical plant to make styrene monomer, a vital raw material for synthetic rubber. Monsanto Chemical Company contracted to operate the facility, which became the nucleus of an even larger petrochemical complex after the war. By 1950, the local population had reached 16,620.

1947 Texas City disaster

The postwar prosperity was interrupted on the morning of April 16, 1947, when the French ship Grandcamp, containing ammonium nitrate fertilizer, exploded, initiating what is generally regarded as the worst industrial accident in United States history, the Texas City disaster. The fertilizer manufactured in Nebraska and Iowa was already overheating when stored at the Texas City docks. The blast devastated the Monsanto plant and offices, which were immediately across the slip from the Grandcamp, blew away the warehouses, showered shrapnel from the ship in all directions, and ignited a second ship, the S.S.High Flyer, docked at an adjacent slip. Released from its mooring by the blast, the High Flyer rammed a third ship, SS Wilson B. Keene, docked across the slip. Both ships also carried ammonium nitrate fertilizer and were ablaze.  They, too, exploded. In all, the explosions killed 581 and injured over 5,000 people. The explosions were so powerful and intense that many of the bodies of the emergency workers who responded to the initial explosion were never accounted for. The entire Texas City and Port Terminal Fire departments were wiped out.

The steel-reinforced concrete grain elevator was pockmarked with shrapnel and the drive shaft of the Grandcamp was embedded in the headhouse. The ship's anchor was hurled several miles away, where it was discovered embedded in the ground at the PanAmerican refinery. School children and townspeople who were attracted to the smoke also died, and entire blocks of homes near the port were destroyed. Surrounding chemical and oil tanks and refineries were ignited by the blast. At least 63 who died and were not able to be identified are memorialized in a cemetery in the north part of town. The Texas City disaster is widely regarded as the foundation of disaster planning for the United States. Monsanto and other plants committed to rebuilding, and the city ultimately recovered quite well from the accident. Numerous petrochemical refineries are still located in the same port area of Texas City. The city has often referred to itself as "the town that would not die," a moniker whose accuracy would be tested once again in the days surrounding Hurricane Ike's assault on the region early on September 13, 2008.

1987 Marathon Oil refinery hydrogen fluoride gas release

2005 BP explosion

On March 23, 2005, the city suffered another explosion in a local BP (formerly Amoco) oil refinery which killed 15 and injured 180. In the U.S. Chemical Safety and Hazard Investigation Board (CSB)'s final report on the accident, published in March 2007, they described the event as "one of the worst industrial disasters in recent U.S. history." The BP facility in Texas City is the United States' third-largest oil refinery, employing over 2,000 people, processing 460,000 barrels (73,000 m³) of crude oil each day, and producing roughly 4% of the country's gasoline.

2008 Hurricane Ike

Even in the widespread destruction throughout Galveston County caused by the wind and surge associated with Ike, Texas City was largely spared the devastation that other low-lying areas suffered. Texas City is mostly surrounded by a  levee system that was built in the early 1960s following the devastating floods from Hurricane Carla in 1961. Together with pump stations containing several Archimedes' screws located at various places throughout the northeast periphery of the city adjoining Galveston, Dollar Bay, and Moses Lake, the levee and pump station system may well have saved the city from wholesale devastation at the hands of Ike's powerful tidal surge. Damage in the city was largely limited to that caused by Ike's powerful winds and heavy rains.

Beginning Sunday, September 14, 2008, the day after landfall, Texas City's high school football complex, Stingaree Stadium, was used as a staging and relocation area for persons evacuated by National Guard Black Hawk helicopters from nearby bayfront communities such as the Bolivar Peninsula and Galveston Island. Also, by the morning of Monday, September 15, the American Red Cross had opened a relief and material distribution center in the city.

The Texas City Dike was overtopped by a greater than  storm surge when Hurricane Ike barreled through the region in the early-morning hours of Saturday, September 13, 2008. Although all buildings, piers, and the Dike Road were destroyed, the dike itself weathered the storm. The dike was closed for three years while the road and supporting facilities were rebuilt. It was reopened to traffic in September 2011.

Geography

Texas City is located at  (29.399983, −94.933851).

Officially, the elevation of Texas City is 10 feet above sea level, though some areas are even lower. It was naturally vulnerable to flooding by hurricane storm surges and heavy rainstorms.

The land south and west of the city is flat coastal plain. A large part of this area to the south is marshland. Texas City is bounded on the north by Moses Lake, which is fed by Moses Bayou, a freshwater stream. The lake drains into Galveston Bay, which bounds the city on the east.

Demographics

2020 census

As of the 2020 United States census, there were 51,898 people, 17,499 households, and 11,795 families residing in the city.

2000 census
As of the census of 2000,  41,521 people, 15,479 households, and 10,974 families resided in the city. The population density was 665.7 people per square mile (257.0/km2). The 16,715 housing units averaged 268.0/sq mi (103.5/km2). The racial makeup of the city was 60.75% White, 27.47% African American, 0.50% Native American, 0.88% Asian, 0.05% Pacific Islander, 8.23% from other races, and 2.12% from two or more races. Hispanics or Latinos of any race were 20.52% of the population.

Of the 15,479 households, 33.1% had children under the age of 18 living with them, 48.6% were married couples living together, 17.3% had a female householder with no husband present, and 29.1% were not families. About 24.8% of all households were made up of individuals, and 9.3% had someone living alone who was 65 years of age or older. The average household size was 2.62 and the average family size was 3.13.

In the city, the population was distributed as  26.7% under the age of 18, 9.6% from 18 to 24, 27.8% from 25 to 44, 22.4% from 45 to 64, and 13.4% who were 65 years of age or older. The median age was 36 years. For every 100 females, there were 89.4 males. For every 100 females age 18 and over, there were 84.7 males.

The median income for a household in the city was $35,963, and for a family was $42,393. Males had a median income of $36,463 versus $24,754 for females. The per capita income for the city was $17,057. About 12.0% of families and 14.9% of the population were below the poverty line, including 20.5% of those under age 18 and 11.2% of those aged 65 or over.

Racial groups
The Hispanic and Latino population's percentage of the overall population of Texas City had increased to 29.9% in 2017 from 27% in 2010, and by then the city had a Hispanic supermarket and other businesses catering to Hispanics. The African-American percentage had declined to 28% in 2017 from 30.8% in 2010.

Economy

The Texas City economy has long been based on heavy industry, particularly shipping at the Port of Texas City, as well as petroleum and petrochemical refining. The Texas City Industrial Complex is a leading center of the petrochemical industry. Within this complex, the Galveston Bay Refinery operated by Marathon is the second-largest petroleum refinery in Texas and third-largest in the United States. The Port of Texas City became the third-leading port in Texas by tonnage and ninth in the nation. In recent decades, the city's planners have made efforts to diversify the economy into tourism, health care, and many other sectors. As early as 1974, Texas City was placed on the top-ten list for the EPA superfund.  Outdated practices for the disposal of toxic waste have continued there for years.

, SSA Marine Company had plans to build a major new cargo container shipping terminal known as the Texas City International Terminal at Shoal Point. The project is intended to capitalize on the expansion of the Panama Canal, scheduled for completion in 2014, which city officials expect to substantially increase trade between the Gulf Coast and Asia.

The Port of Texas City, operated by the Port of Texas City / Texas City Terminal Railway, is the eighth-largest port in the United States and the third-largest in Texas, with waterborne tonnage exceeding 78 million net tons. The Texas City Terminal Railway Company provides an important land link to the port, handling over 25,000 carloads per year. The Port of Texas City's success as a privately owned port has been aided by its shareholders, the Union Pacific and Burlington Northern Santa Fe railroads, whose connections allow for expeditious interchange of their traffic.

Government and infrastructure

In 2008, the city government replaced civilian code-enforcement officers with police officers after finding that residents tended to ignore civilian officials, who must go through a lengthy process to force compliance, said George Fuller, city director of community development.

The Texas Department of Criminal Justice maintains the Young Medical Facility Complex for females in Texas City. Young opened in 1996 as the Texas City Regional Medical Unit.

The Texas City Post Office is located at 2002 11th Avenue North, in the Tradewinds Shopping Center.

Education

Primary and secondary schools

Public schools

Most of Texas City is served by the Texas City Independent School District, which has four elementary schools for grades K–4: Kohfeldt Elementary, Roosevelt-Wilson Elementary, Heights Elementary, and Guajardo Elementary. The TCISD intermediate school, Levi Fry Intermediate, provides for fifth and sixth graders, and one TCISD middle school, Blocker Middle School, provides for seventh and eighth graders. Texas City High School serves the TCISD portion of Texas City.

Other portions are a part of the Dickinson Independent School District.

Some were previously in the La Marque Independent School District. On December 2, 2015, Texas Education Agency (TEA) Commissioner Michael Williams announced that the Texas City Independent School District would absorb the La Marque district effective July 1, 2016.

Private schools

Our Lady of Fatima School, a Roman Catholic elementary school operated by the Archdiocese of Galveston-Houston, is in Texas City.

Colleges and universities

Texas City is served by the College of the Mainland, which is located in Texas City.

Public libraries

The Moore Memorial Public Library is located at 1701 9th Avenue North. In 1928, the City of Texas City dedicated a room in city hall to form a municipal library. The Texas City Civic Club operated the library in the room. In 1947, city hall received damage from the Texas City explosion; it was later demolished. In 1948, the library moved to a former house at 5th Street and 9th Avenue North and received its current name; it was named after Hugh Benton Moore and Helen Moore. In 1964, the library moved into its current building.

The Texas City Museum is at 409 6th Street North, in a two-story building formerly occupied by J. C. Penney Co. It is open Tuesday through Saturday, 10 – 4. The Galveston County Model Railroad Club exhibit on the second floor is open on Saturdays.

Parks and preserves

The city operates 42 parks, some of which are part of the Great Texas Coastal Birding Trail.

The Texas City Prairie Preserve is a  nature preserve located on the shores of Moses Lake opposite the city. The terrain of the preserve includes prairie and wetland habitats. The preserve includes  of public-access areas, including campsites. The remainder of the preserve is available for tours, including boardwalk access through the marshes.

The Bay Street Park is a  property near the bay and the levee. Part of the park commemorates the Aero Squadron, one of the first U.S. Army air squadrons and a precursor to the modern Air Force. The rest of the park features wilderness trails and family entertainment areas.

Nessler Park is a  property used for community events such as the annual "Music Fest by the Bay". Other large city parks include Carver Park, Godard Park, and Holland Park.

The centerpiece of Texas City's Heritage Square historical district is the former residence of one of the city's fathers, Frank B. Davison, located at 109 3rd Ave. The Davison Home, maintained by the Texas City Museum with the help of the Texas City Historical Association, is a Victorian-styled home finished in 1897, and the site where the first child was born in the new community of Texas City.

Transportation
The major freeway serving the area is the Gulf Freeway, part of Interstate 45, which connects Texas City with Galveston and Houston. Texas State Highway 146 locally connects Texas City with other Galveston Bay Area communities on the shoreline. Texas Loop 197 combines with Highway 146 to form a ring around the city, providing access to the city's major areas.

Greyhound Bus Lines provides passenger bus service to destinations nationwide at the Texas City La Marque Station in neighboring La Marque. Amtrak provides a connecting motorcoach service from nearby Galveston.

Notable people
Charles Brown, blues singer and pianist
John Carona, politician
Frank B. Davison, city pioneer who built Davison home, now a museum
George Ducas, country music singer
Charlie Dupre, former NFL player
L.G. Dupre, former NFL player
Ben Emanuel, American football player
D'Onta Foreman, professional football player
Andy Hassler, professional baseball player
Johnny Lee, country music singer
Edi Patterson, actress on The Righteous Gemstones
Stone Phillips, television reporter and correspondent
Ron Raines, actor
Mary Simpson, one of the first women to be ordained a priest by the American Episcopal Church
Donna Wick, author and broadcaster
Chris Ballard, NFL Colts General Manager 
Hayden Victoria, Sports Executive

Texas City in media 
 The 2021 movie Red Rocket is set in Texas City.

References

External links

 City of Texas City official website
 Historic Photos from the Moore Memorial Public Library, Texas City, hosted by the Portal to Texas History
 
 "Texas City Markers." The Historical Markers Database. Retrieved March 11, 2012
Wheaton, Grant. "Annals of Texas City Port of Opportunity."

 
1911 establishments in Texas
Populated places established in 1911
Cities in Galveston County, Texas
Cities in Texas
Greater Houston
Galveston Bay Area
Populated coastal places in Texas